Adhiparasakthi College of Arts and Science, is a general degree college located in Kalavai, Vellore district, Tamil Nadu. It was established in the year 1988. The college is affiliated with Thiruvalluvar University. This college offers different courses in arts, commerce and science.

Departments

Science
Mathematics
Microbiology
Biochemistry
Computer Science

Arts and Commerce
English
Business Administration
Commerce

Accreditation
The college is  recognized by the University Grants Commission (UGC).

References

External links

Educational institutions established in 1988
1988 establishments in Tamil Nadu
Colleges affiliated to Thiruvalluvar University
Academic institutions formerly affiliated with the University of Madras